Sangti Valley is valley located in Eastern Himalayan Foothills. It is located in West Kameng district of Arunachal Pradesh. Sangti River flows along with the valley.

Sangti Valley is know for its picturesque scenaries and wheather. The valley is also a tourist destination for trekkers.

Sangti village is located onsite of valley and about 15 kilometres from Dirang. At Dirang Dzong village Sangti river meet Dirang River. The village is located near the Dirang town.

Transportation

Road 
The village connected through Bomdilla - Tawang highway. There is a road which connects Dirang Dzong village to Sangti Village which is about 10km long.

Places 

 Sangti Village, village located inside the valley. The village comes under Dirang circle of West Kameng district. The village located 45 km from district headquarter at Bomdila. The village is mostly inhibited by Monpa people who follow Mahayana Buddhism. The population of the village is 630.
 Buddhist Monasteries, there are many Monpa worshipped monasteries located alongside valley.
 Sangti Valley Sheep Farm, is sheep breeding farm located 7 km from Dirang located on bank of Sangti river.
 Campsite, there many campsites located in the valley along with the river. They are owned and maintained by locals.

Wildlife 
The valley is breeding centre for endangered specie of Black-necked crane (thing thung karmu). The bird is considered holy in Monpa communities resides in valley.

References

External Links 

Cities and towns in West Kameng district